Turkish Union Party may refer to:

Turkish Union Party (Northern Cyprus)
Unity Party (Turkey)